NGC 4312 is an edge-on unbarred spiral galaxy located about 55 million light-years away in the constellation Coma Berenices. It was discovered by astronomer William Herschel on January 14, 1787. NGC 4312 is a member of the Virgo Cluster and is a LINER galaxy.

It has undergone ram-pressure stripping in the past.

Black Hole
NGC 4312 may harbor an intermediate-mass black hole with an estimated mass ranging from 10,000 (1*10^4) to 300,000 (3*10^5) solar masses.

See also
 List of NGC objects (4001–5000)

References

External links

4312
040095
Coma Berenices
Astronomical objects discovered in 1787
Unbarred spiral galaxies
7442
Virgo Cluster
LINER galaxies